Cardiac rehabilitation (CR) is defined by the World Health Organization (WHO) as "The sum of activity and interventions required to ensure the best possible physical, mental, and social conditions so that patients with chronic or post-acute cardiovascular disease may, by their own efforts, preserve or resume their proper place in society and lead an active life". CR is a comprehensive model of care including established core components, including structured exercise, patient education, psychosocial counselling, risk factor reduction and behaviour modification, with a goal of optimizing patient's quality of life while helping to reduce the risk of future heart problems.

CR is delivered by a multi-disciplinary team, often headed by a physician such as a cardiologist. Nurses support patients in reducing medical risk factors such as high blood pressure, high cholesterol and diabetes. Physiotherapists or other exercise professionals develop an individualized and structured exercise plan, including resistance training. A dietitian helps create a healthy eating plan. A social worker or psychologist may help patients to alleviate stress and address any identified psychological conditions; for tobacco users, they can offer counseling or recommend other proven treatments to support patients in their efforts to quit. Support for return-to-work can also be provided. CR programs are very patient-centered.

Based on the benefits summarized below, CR programs are recommended by the American Heart Association / American College of Cardiology and the European Society of Cardiology, among other associations. Patients typically enter CR in the weeks following an acute coronary event such as a myocardial infarction (heart attack), with a diagnosis of heart failure, or following percutaneous coronary intervention (such as coronary stent placement), coronary artery bypass surgery, a valve procedure, or insertion of a rhythm device (e.g., pacemaker, implantable cardioverter defibrillator).

CR Setting 
CR services can be provided in hospital, in an outpatient setting such as a community center, or remotely at home using the phone and other technologies. Hybrid programs are also increasingly being offered.

In recent years, new consumer-based devices have been introduced and improved in order to allow patients to monitor themselves at home. Most studies have looked at smart-devices such as the Apple Watch and FitBit. One study reported the Apple Watch showing a slightly more accurate heart-rate reading over time, versus the FitBit with a 95% and a 91% agreement rate to the ECG, respectively. Additionally, another study saw that the Apple Watch to produced clinically acceptable accuracy, which could potentially aid millions of patients with cardiac illnesses track their heart-rates consistently throughout the day in order to prevent serious cardiac events. Moreover, there are other consumer-based products available that have been found to have similar accuracy, such as a chest-worn heart rate monitor and a heart-rate vest with the chest-strap, producing 0.76% mean absolute percentage error (MAPE) and the vest-worn monitor producing 3.32% MAPE.

CR Phases

Inpatient program (phase I)

Engaging in cardiopulmonary rehabilitation before leaving the hospital can improve a patient’s outlook on their recovery, as well as facilitate a smoother return to regular activities of daily living once they return home. Many patients express anxiety about their recovery during a hospital stay, especially after a severe illness or surgery so Phase I CR provides an opportunity for patients to test their abilities in a safe, supervised setting.

Where available, patients receiving CR in the hospital after surgery are usually able to begin within a day or two. First steps include simple motion exercises that can be done sitting down, such as lifting the arms.  Heart rate and blood oxygen levels are closely monitored by a therapist as the patient begins to walk, or exercise using a stationary bicycle. The therapist ensures that the level of aerobic and strength training are appropriate for the patient’s current status and gradually progresses their therapeutic exercises.

Outpatient program (phase II)
It is recommended patients begin outpatient CR within 2–7 days following a percutaneous intervention, 4–6 weeks after cardiac surgery or the intervening 6–8 weeks after discharge from hospital. In order to participate in an outpatient program, the patient generally must first obtain a physician's referral. This period is often very difficult for patients due to fears of over-exertion or a recurrence of heart issues.

Participation typically begins with an intake evaluation that includes measurement of cardiac risk factors such as lipid measures, blood pressure, body composition, depression / anxiety, and tobacco use. A functional capacity test is usually performed both to determine if exercise is safe and to allow for the development of a customized exercise program.

Risk factors are addressed and patients goals are established; a "case-manager" who may be a cardiac-trained Registered Nurse, Physiotherapist, or an exercise physiologist who works to help patients achieve their targets. During exercise, the patient's heart rate and blood pressure may be monitored to check the intensity of activity.

The duration of CR varies from program to program, and can range from six weeks to several years. Globally, a median of 24 sessions are offered, and it is well-established that the more the better.

After CR is finished, there are long-term maintenance programs (phase III) available to interested patients, as benefits are optimized with long-term adherence; unfortunately however patients generally have to pay out-of-pocket for these services.

Under-use of cardiac rehabilitation
CR is significantly under-used globally. Rates vary widely.

Under-use is caused by multi-level factors. At the health system level, this includes lack of available programs. At the provider level, there are low referral rates by physicians, who often focus more attention on better reimbursed cardiac intervention procedures than on long-term lifestyle treatments. At the patient level, factors such as transportation, distance, cost, competing responsibilities, lack of awareness and other health conditions are responsible, but most can be mitigated. Women, ethnocultural minorities, older patients, those of lower socio-economic status, with comorbidities, and living in rural areas are less likely to access CR, despite the fact that these patients often need it most. Cardiac patients can assess their CR barriers here, and receive suggestions on how to overcome them: https://globalcardiacrehab.com/For-Patients.

Strategies are now established on how we can mitigate these barriers to CR use. It is important for inpatient units treating cardiac patients to institute automatic/systematic or electronic referral to CR. It is also key for healthcare providers to promote CR to patients at the bedside. The National Institute for Health and Care Excellence (NICE) offer helpful recommendations on encouraging patients to attend CR. Offering programs tailored to under-served groups such as women may also facilitate program adherence.

Benefits
Participation in cardiac rehabilitation may be associated with many benefits. For acute coronary syndrome patients, cardiac rehabilitation reduces cardiovascular mortality by 25% and readmission rates by 20%. The potential benefit in all-cause mortality is not as clear, however there is some evidence that cardiac rehabilitation may lead to significant reductions in all-cause mortality.

Cardiac rehabilitation is associated with improved quality of life, improved psychosocial well-being, and functional capacity, and is cost-effective. In low and middle-income countries, there is some evidence that cardiac rehabilitation is effective at improving functional capacity, risk factors and quality of life robustly in these settings as well.

There appears to be no difference in outcomes between supervised and home-based CR programs, and both cost about the same. Home-based CR is generally safe. Home-based programs with technology are similarly shown to be effective.

There are specific reviews on patients with specific health conditions such as valve issues, atrial fibrillation, heart transplant recipients, and heart failure.

CR Societies 
CR professionals work together in many countries to optimize service delivery and increase awareness of CR. The International Council of Cardiovascular Prevention and Rehabilitation (ICCPR), a member of the World Heart Federation, is composed of formally-named Board members of CR societies globally. Through cooperation across most CR-related associations, ICCPR seeks to promote CR in low-resource settings, among other aims outlined in their Charter.

References 

Rehabilitation medicine